Casorezzo (locally Casoesso ) is a town and comune in the Metropolitan City of Milan, Lombardy, northern Italy, about  from Milan, Italy.

References

External links 
 

Cities and towns in Lombardy